Robert Dixon Young (July 24, 1867 – June 12, 1962) was a leader in the Church of Jesus Christ of Latter-day Saints (LDS Church).

Young was born in Kirkintilloch, Dunbartonshire, Scotland. In 1872, he immigrated to the United States with his parents, who as Latter-day Saints wanted to join with the body of church members.  They lived in Salt Lake City for about a year and then moved to Richfield, Utah. In 1891, Young was ordained a seventy by Francis M. Lyman. That same year, Young married Mary S. Parker. He served as a missionary for the LDS Church in Australia from 1901 to 1904.

In 1910, Young became president of the Sevier Stake, which was at that point coterminous with Sevier County, Utah. In 1921, the stake was divided into three, and Young continued as president of the Sevier Stake, which was reduced to having only Richfield and such neighboring towns as Glenwood and Venice.

Young and his wife Mary were the parents of eight children. For several years, Young was connected with the operations of the Otter Creek Reservoir Company.

Young was released as president of the Sevier Stake in 1933 when he was called to serve as president of the Manti Temple. He served in this position until 1943. Young served as president of the Salt Lake Temple from 1949 to 1953.

Sources
N. B. Lundwall. Temples of the Most High. (Salt Lake City: Bookcraft, 1968) p. 113, 133.
 page 744
Conference Report, April 1963.

External links
 and also here (gives birthyear 1869)

1867 births
1962 deaths
20th-century Mormon missionaries
American leaders of the Church of Jesus Christ of Latter-day Saints
British Latter Day Saints
Latter Day Saints from Utah
Mormon missionaries in Australia
People from Kirkintilloch
People from Richfield, Utah
Scottish Latter Day Saints
Scottish Mormon missionaries
Scottish emigrants to the United States
Scottish leaders of the Church of Jesus Christ of Latter-day Saints
Temple presidents and matrons (LDS Church)